Floyd Alburn Firestone (1898–1986) was an acoustical physicist, who in 1940 while a professor at the University of Michigan invented the first practical ultrasonic testing method and apparatus. He was granted US Patent 2,280,226 for the invention in 1942. Manufactured by Sperry Corporation, the testing device was known variously as the Firestone-Sperry Reflectoscope, the Sperry Ultrasonic Reflectoscope, the Sperry Reflectoscope and sometimes also just as a Supersonic Reflectoscope, the name Firestone had originally coined for the instrument. The technology is not just used in quality control in factories to reject defective parts before shipment, but also revolutionized transportation safety. For example, ultrasonic testing is used for safety maintenance inspection of railroad cars, particularly axles and wheels, aircraft, particularly fuselages, and other transportation vessels for material fatigue. Dr. Firestone's ultrasonic pulse echo technique for metal defect testing was also later applied in medical diagnosis, giving birth to the field of Echocardiography and to the field of Medical Ultrasonography, generally. Dr. Firestone was the editor of the Journal of the Acoustical Society of America from 1939 to 1957. Among Firestone's many other inventions in his field are in a single year an “automatic device for the minute inspection of flaws”, “a new and useful improvement in hook-up of electrical apparatus”, and “[a] device for measuring noise”, and, even, later a “musical typewriter”.

In 1933, Firestone proposed an alternative to the mechanical–electrical analogy of James Clerk Maxwell in which force is made the analogy of voltage (the impedance analogy).  Firestone's analogy (now called the mobility analogy) makes force the analogy of current.  In this work he introduced the concept of "through" and "across" variables and demonstrated that there were analogies for these variables in other energy domains, making it possible to treat a complex system as a unified whole in analysis.  Firestone's analogy became popular amongst mechanical filter designers because it has the property of preserving network topologies when transforming between the mechanical and electrical domains.

He was elected a fellow of the American Physical Society in January 1936. He was a fellow of the Acoustical Society of America and its president from 1943 to 1945.

Papers
 
 Firestone, Floyd A. (1946). The Supersonic Reflectoscope, An instrument for inspecting the interior of  solid parts by means of sound waves. Journal of the Acoustical Society of America, 17(3), 287–299,   Full Article

See also
 Nondestructive testing

References

External links
 History of NDT-Instrumentation

1898 births
1986 deaths
20th-century American physicists
Acousticians
University of Michigan faculty
ASA Gold Medal recipients
Fellows of the Acoustical Society of America
Fellows of the American Physical Society